Ron Robinson may refer to:

Ron Robinson (baseball) (born 1962), former professional baseball pitcher
Ron Robinson (Canadian football) (born 1956), former slotback and wide receiver
Ron Robinson, president of the Young America's Foundation

See also
Ronald Robinson (disambiguation)